Springwater is a township in central Ontario, Canada, in Simcoe County, near Barrie.  It is the county seat of Simcoe County.

History
Prior to European settlement, Ossossane, the largest Wendat settlement and capital of the confederacy was located near modern day Elmvale.

Springwater was formed in 1994 through the amalgamation of Flos and Vespra Townships, together with the Village of Elmvale and a portion of the former Medonte Township.

Communities
The community derived its name from a well-known mill operating in the area in the late 1800s. The first syllables of this firm's name, Anderson & Tennant, after its owners Charles Anderson and a Mr. Tennant, were merged to create the word Anten. Country music star Jason McCoy grew up in Anten Mills.

Most of the workforce living in Anten Mills are employed in nearby Barrie.  The area surrounding Anten Mills is predominantly either farm or crown land; however, golf courses, ski resorts and hiking trails also dot the landscape.

Some 25 km northwest of Anten Mills is Wasaga Beach, a popular summer tourist attraction.

Crown Hill is located at the municipal boundaries of Springwater and Oro-Medonte, just outside the northern city limits of Barrie. Prior to the provincial highway downloads of 1997, Highway 11 left its expressway route through Oro-Medonte at Crown Hill, transferring onto Penetanguishene Road for the remainder of its southerly route into Barrie and Toronto. Highway 11 now continues past the Penetanguishene Road interchange along the former route of Highway 400A, ending at Highway 400 1.1 kilometres further southwest.

Elmvale is located at the intersection of County Road 27 and County Road 92 (Queen Street). The Elmvale Maple Syrup Festival, established in 1966, draws thousands of visitors each year. Elmvale was home to 2,369 people in 2011. It is the site of the Elmvale Jungle Zoo.

 
Hillsdale is located on Highway 93 at its intersection with Mill Street, just north of Highway 400. It was founded as the half-way point between Lake Simcoe and Georgian Bay. It was the site of the Simcoe House Hotel (now abandoned) and Rumble's Gristmill on Sturgeon River. Hillsdale is home to approximately 1,000 people.

Midhurst is the largest population centre in the township. It is home to the Barrie Baycats of the Intercounty Baseball League. A tree nursery operated here that supplied trees for the province.

Minesing is a community near the Nottawasaga River on Highway 26, northwest of Barrie.  The community holds two major events every year, one in the late winter called Mini-fest, and a slow-pitch tournament that falls on Labour Day weekend. The community is the birthplace of Hockey Hall of Famer Frank Foyston and is home to Country music star Jason McCoy. It has a small school known as Minesing Central Public School. The nearby Minesing Wetlands is an internationally recognized wetland of significant biological importance.

Along with the main centres of Anten Hills, Crown Hill, Elmvale, Hillsdale, Midhurst and Minesing, the township contains the communities of Allenwood, Apto, Craighurst, Crossland, Dalston, Edenvale, Fergusonvale, Grenfel, Hendrie, Langman, New Flos, Orr Lake, Phelpston, Sandy Beach, Saurin, Snow Valley, Vespra Village, Strongville and Vigo. Two former ghost communities, called Josephine and McKinnon, existed in the Minesing Swamp within the township's borders.

Government

Council

Springwater is governed by a seven-person elected Council; a Mayor, Deputy Mayor, and five Ward Councillors. The Council is currently comprised by:

 Mayor: Jennifer Coughlin
 Deputy Mayor: George Cabral
 Ward 1 Councillor: Matt Garwood
 Ward 2 Councillor: Danielle Alexander
 Ward 3 Councillor: Brad Thompson
 Ward 4 Councillor: Anita Moore
 Ward 5 Councillor: Phil Fisher

Committees

Springwater also has a number of committees that advise Council on more specific issues.

The Springwater Public Library Board consists of Jane Cocking, Jennifer St-Onge, Evan Chen
Adrian Graham, Robert Sturgess, and Stephen Ouderkirk.

The Committee of Adjustment consists of Henry Vander Wielen, Brad Sokach, Michael Douglas, Wanda Maw-Chapman, and Steven Farquharson.

The Agricultural Advisory Committee consists of James Drury, Mark Priest, Matt Ververs, and Wanda Maw-Chapman.

The Cultural and Heritage Advisory Committee consists of Hale Mahon, Donna Kenwell, Greg Barker, Doug Kirton, Catherine Czajkowski, and Teresa Lapierre.

The member representing Springwater on the Joint Accessibility Advisory Committee is Caleb Brohm.

Demographics 

See also
List of townships in Ontario

References

External links

Lower-tier municipalities in Ontario
Municipalities in Simcoe County
Township municipalities in Ontario